The fish family Psychrolutidae (commonly known as blobfishes, toadfishes, flathead sculpins, tadpole sculpins,) contains over 35 recognized species in 8 genera. This family consists of bottom-dwelling marine sculpins shaped like tadpoles, with large heads and bodies that taper back into small, flat tails. The skin is loosely attached and movable, and the layer underneath it is gelatinous. The eyes are placed high on the head, focused forward closer to the tip of the snout. Members of the family generally have large, leaf-like pectoral fins and lack scales, although some species are covered with soft spines. This is important to the species as the depths in which they live are highly pressurized and they are ambush/opportunistic/foraging predators that do not expend energy unless they are forced to. The blobfish has a short, broad tongue and conical teeth that are slightly recurved and are arranged in bands in irregular rows along the premaxillaries; canines are completely absent. Teeth are nonexistent on the palatines and vomer; which make up the hard palate. The blobfish also has a set of specialized pharyngeal teeth that are well developed and paired evenly along the upper and lower portions of the pharyngeal arch. These specialized teeth may aid in the breakdown of food due to the very strategic dependency on whatever food falls from above.

They are found in the Atlantic and Pacific Ocean. Psychrolutes phrictus have been reported near the Mexican Pacific coast, which extends the southern range by 1,733 km. Myoxocephalus thompsonii, deepwater sculpin, have even been reported in Lake Ontario which were once thought to be extirpated. Psychrolutidae species tend to habituate the northern most region of the Pacific ocean due to lower temperatures, and Indian Oceans. They are found in depths ranging from 300–1,700 meters. In this case the blobfish can live to be roughly 130 years old. Categorized as the predator of the deep sea they have no real predatory issues; a big help to aid in their energy saving. Their diet also helps in their energy saving abilities. They feed on small crustaceans, sea pens, sea worms, and any other small organisms that swim right in front of them. Their name is derived from the Greek psychrolouteo, meaning "to have a cold bath". They tend to live in colder waters, although some range into warm-temperate seas.

The blob sculpin, Psychrolutes phrictus, exhibits complex nesting behaviors complete with egg guarding. Reproductively the blobfish have been seen gathering in large numbers to lay their pinkish eggs in a single surrounding nesting area. The number of eggs laid within one nest can range from 9,000 to 108,000. Another observation of the parental care of the blobfish is that their eggs resemble being cleaned. It is believed that as the female blobfish hover around the nests they also clean them and remove any sand or dirt.

Subfamilies and genera
Psychrolutidae is divided into two subfamilies in the 5th edition of Fishes of the World as follows:

 subfamily Cottunculinae Regan, 1913
 Ambophthalmos K. L. Jackson & J. S. Nelson, 1998
 Cottunculus Collett, 1876
 Dasycottus T.H. Bean, 1890
 Eurymen Gilbert & Burke, 1912
 Malacocottus T.H. Bean, 1890
 subfamily Psychrolutinae Günther, 1861
 Ebinania Sakamoto, 1932
 Gilbertidia Berg, 1898
 Neophrynichthys Günther, 1876
 Psychrolutes Günther, 1861

Other authorities include many of the genera of marine sculpins from the family Cottidae in the Psychrolutidae, leaving the Cottidae as a largely freshwater family. For example, the Catalog of Fishes classifies the family as follows:

 subfamily Psychrolutinae Günther, 1861
 Alcichthys Jordan & Starks, 1904
 Ambophthalmos Jackson & Nelson, 1998
 Andriashevicottus Fedorov, 1990
 Antipodocottus Bolin, 1952
 Archistes Jordan & Gilbert, 1898
 Artediellichthys Fedorov, 1973
 Artediellina Taranetz 1941
 Artedielloides Soldatov, 1922
 Artediellus Jordan, 1885
 Ascelichthys Jordan & Gilbert, 1880
 Astrocottus Bolin, 1936
 Atopocottus Bolin, 1936
 Bero Jordan & Starks, 1904
 Bolinia Yabe, 1991
 Chitonotus Lockington, 1879
 Cottiusculus Jordan & Starks, 1904
 Cottunculus Collett, 1875
 Daruma Jordan & Starks, 1904
 Dasycottus T.H. Bean, 1890
 Ebinania Sakamoto, 1932
 Eurymen Gilbert & Burke, 1912
 Gilbertidia Berg, 1898
 Leiocottus Girard, 1856
 Lepidobero K. J. Qin & X. B. Jin, 1992
 Malacocottus T.H. Bean, 1890
 Micrenophrys Andriashev, 1954
 Neophrynichthys Günther, 1876
 Ocynectes Jordan & Starks, 1904
 Phallocottus Schultz, 1938
 Phasmatocottus Bolin, 1936
 Pseudoblennius Temminck & Schlegel, 1850
 Psychrolutes Günther, 1861
 Radulinopsis Soldatov & Lindberg , 1930
 Ricuzenius Jordan & Starks, 1904
 Ruscarius Jordan & Starks, 1895
 Sigmistes Rutter, 1898
 Stelgistrum Jordan & Gilbert, 1898
 Synchirus T.H. Bean, 1890
 Taurocottus Soldatov & Pavlenko, 1915
 Thyriscus Gilbert & Burke, 1912
 Trichocottus Soldatov & Pavlenko, 1915
 Triglops Reinhardt, 1830
 Vellitor  Jordan & Starks, 1904
 Zesticelus Jordan & Evermann, 1896
 subfamily Myoxocephalinae Gill, 1908
 Argyrocottus Herzenstein, 1892
 Enophrys Swainson, 1839
 Megalocottus Gill, 1861
 Microcottus Schmidt, 1940
 Myoxocephalus Tilesius, 1811
 Porocottus Gill, 1859
 Taurulus Gratzianov, 1907
 subfamily Oligocottinae Hubbs, 1926
 Artedius Girard, 1856
 Clinocottus Gill, 1861
 Furcina  Jordan & Starks, 1904
 Icelinus Jordan, 1885
 Oligocottus Girard 1856
 Orthonopias Starks & Mann, 1911
 Stlengis Jordan & Starks, 1904
 subfamily Icelinae Jordan, 1923
 Chitonotus Lockington, 1879
 Gymnocanthus Swainson, 1839
 Icelus Krøyer, 1845
 Rastrinus Jordan & Evermann, 1896
 subfamily Radulinae Taranetz, 1941
 Asemichthys Gilbert, 1912
 Radulinus Gilbert, 1890

References

Glubokov, A.I., Glubokovskii, M.K. & Kovacheva, N.P. New Data on Soft Sculpin Malacocottus zonurus (Psychrolutidae) from the Northwestern Bering Sea. J. Ichthyol. 59, 435–438 (2019). Retrieved 23 March, 2021.

External links
Photo of a Fathead trawled near New Zealand

 
Cottoidea
Ray-finned fish families